Aadarsh Balakrishna is an Indian actor primarily known for his negative roles in Telugu films. He is also the runner up of Telugu reality TV show Bigg Boss 1.

Early life
Aadarsh was born on 10 February 1984 in Bangalore. His father, Balakrishna, is a businessman while his mother Uma is a homemaker. He has a younger sister, Apoorva, who is an architect. Aadarsh studied at Sophia High School, Bangalore until Standard 3. His family then moved to Hyderabad where he continued his schooling at Bharatiya Vidya Bhavan Public School and St. Andrews High School. He completed his graduation from Nizam College in 2005–06, majoring in commerce. He was a cricketer and nurtured an ambition to play for India. He represented Hyderabad in various state-level categories and also played for Osmania University.

Kannada film director Prashanth Neel, Sriimurali’s wife, Vidya, and Naresh's second wife, Ramya Raghupathi, are his cousins.

Career

Aadarsh aspired to become a cricketer as a child and played at the state level in his teens. While he was training at St John's Cricket Academy, he was spotted by Nagesh Kukunoor's team, who were on the lookout for a real cricketer to play the role of 'Kamal' opposite Shreyas Talpade and was asked to audition for Iqbal. He was given the role of Kamal, and Iqbal went on to become a critical and commercial success. It was produced by Subhash Ghai's Mukta Searchlight Films and won a National Award in 2005. Later, Aadarsh got his big break in Tollywood with the movie Happy Days directed by Sekhar Kammula, which was a major blockbuster in 2007. He played Sanjay, a senior bully in the movie, set against an engineering college backdrop. His character was a memorable one and he made his mark as a 'Bad Guy' in Tollywood. He was then seen in Vinayakudu (2008) directed by Sai Kiran Avidi and Ride (2009) directed by Ramesh Varma which also went on to become successes at the box office.
Aadarsh, within a short span, worked with directors like Nagesh Kukunoor, Sekhar Kammula, Gopichand Mallineni and Ram Gopal Varma among others. He made his Kannada film debut in Nooru Janmaku where he played the 2nd lead, directed by Nagathihalli Chandrashekhar, a national award-winning director. He was seen in the film directed by Krishna Vamsi, titled Govindudu Andarivadele with Ram Charan.

Aadarsh represents the Telugu Warriors in the Celebrity Cricket League and is one of their mainstays. He was runner-up in the GRAND FINALE of Bigg Boss Telugu Season 1.

He will be seen playing the role of an Indian Research and Analysis Wing agent in Ullu App's upcoming web series titled Peshawar, which is based on 2014 Peshawar school massacre. His role is loosely based on the real-life hero, who was popularly known as 'Black Tiger'.

Filmography

Film
Note: All films are in Telugu, unless otherwise noted.

Television

References

External links

 

Living people
Telugu male actors
1984 births
Bharatiya Vidya Bhavan schools alumni
Male actors from Bangalore
Indian male film actors
21st-century Indian male actors
Male actors in Telugu cinema
Male actors in Kannada cinema
Male actors in Hindi cinema
Bigg Boss (Telugu TV series) contestants